My Body Is an Ashtray is the third EP by Australian indie pop band Angelas Dish. The EP was released in July 2006, through Boomtown Records, and it peaked at number 94 on the ARIA singles chart; becoming the band's first charting release.

Track listing

Charts

Release history

References

2006 EPs
Angelas Dish albums